Francesco Mileto (born 23 September 1995) is an Italian football player. He plays for Nola.

Club career
He made his Serie B debut for Juve Stabia on 25 May 2014 in a game against Brescia.

References

External links
 

1995 births
Footballers from Naples
Living people
Italian footballers
S.S. Juve Stabia players
A.C.N. Siena 1904 players
A.C.R. Messina players
S.S. Akragas Città dei Templi players
S.S.D. Città di Gela players
Serie B players
Serie C players
Serie D players
Association football defenders